Skip Beat! is an anime series adapted from the manga series of the same name written by Yoshiki Nakamura. Produced by Hal Film Maker, and directed by Kiyoko Sayama, the series would span one season. The first season, comprising twenty five episodes, premiered on TV Tokyo in Japan on October 5, 2008 and ended at March 29, 2009. The story follows Kyoko Mogami who, after coming to Tokyo with her childhood friend and up-and-coming idol Sho Fuwa, discovers that he was merely using her as a maid. She declares that she will exact revenge by entering showbiz and become more famous than he was.

Four pieces of theme music were used: two opening themes and two ending themes. The first opening theme is "Dream Star" performed by the generous, and the first closing theme is "Namida" performed by the hip-hop group 2BACKKA. The second opening theme starting from episode 20 is "Renaissance", also performed by the generous, and the second ending theme is "Eien" performed by Yusaku Kiyama.

Episode list

Skip Beat!